Sanjay Pandurang Shirsat is an Indian politician serving as MLA in Maharashtra Legislative Assembly from  Aurangabad West Vidhan Sabha constituency as a member of Shiv Sena. He has been elected to Vidhan Sabha for three consecutive terms in 2009, 2014, and 2019.

Positions held
 2009: Elected to Maharashtra Legislative Assembly (1st Term)
 2014: Re-elected to Maharashtra Legislative Assembly (2nd Term) 
 2019: Re-elected to Maharashtra Legislative Assembly (3rd Term)

References

External links
  Shivsena Home Page 

Maharashtra MLAs 2014–2019
Living people
Shiv Sena politicians
People from Aurangabad district, Maharashtra
Year of birth missing (living people)